H. Kohl was a piano manufacturer in Hamburg, Germany. 

The owners Theodor John Hellmund Ahrens and Heinrich Peter Blanck were awarded an imperial and royal warrant of appointment to the court of Austria-Hungary.

References 

Manufacturing companies based in Hamburg
Piano manufacturing companies of Germany
Purveyors to the Imperial and Royal Court